Manchester Victoria may refer to:

Manchester Victoria railway station
Manchester Victoria Reversing Sidings
Manchester Victoria stabbing attack
Victoria Park, Manchester
Victoria University of Manchester